The Domestic Road, also known as the Domestic Airport Road, is a  major road in Pasay, Metro Manila, Philippines that links Andrews Avenue from the north to the NAIA Road in the south. It forms the short northwestern perimeter of Ninoy Aquino International Airport (NAIA) and its alignment is north–south running parallel to Roxas Boulevard and the NAIA Expressway located above Electrical Road to the west. It is named after NAIA Terminal 4, also known as Manila Domestic Airport, which is located along the road. Also located on this short road are the Cebu Pacific Airlines Operation Center, Airlink International Aviation School, Salem Commercial Complex and a Park N' Fly.

See also
 NAIA Expressway

References

Streets in Metro Manila